Events in the year 1916 in Japan. It corresponds to Taishō 5 (大正5年) in the Japanese calendar.

Incumbents
Emperor: Emperor Taishō
Prime minister:
Ōkuma Shigenobu: until October 9
Terauchi Masatake: from October 9

Governors
Aichi Prefecture: Matsui Shigeru
Akita Prefecture: Saburo Sakamoto (until 28 April); Genzaburo Kojima (starting 28 April)
Aomori Prefecture: Matsujiro Obama 
Ehime Prefecture: Renarto Fukamachi (until 28 April); Sakata Kanta (starting 28 April)
Fukui Prefecture: Sato Kozaburo 
Fukushima Prefecture: Sukeji Horiguchi (until 28 April); Takukichi Kawasaki (starting 28 April)
Gifu Prefecture: Shimada Gotaro 
Gunma Prefecture: Miyake Gennosuke 
Hiroshima Prefecture: Terada Yushi (until 28 April); Eitaro Mabuchi (starting 28 April)
Hyogo Prefecture: Seino Chotarno (starting month unknown)
Ibaraki Prefecture: Keisuke Sakanaka 
Ishikawa Prefecture: Ōta Masahiro (until month unknown)
Iwate Prefecture: Rinpei Otsu
Kagawa Prefecture: Raizo Wakabayashi
Kochi Prefecture: Toki Kahei (until 13 October); Takeo Kakinuma (starting 13 October)
Kumamoto Prefecture: Kawakami Shinhare (until 13 October); Ōta Masahiro (starting 13 October)
Kyoto Prefecture: Shoichi Omori (until April); Jūshirō Kiuchi (starting April)
Mie Prefecture: 
 until 28 April: Eitaro Mabuchi
 28 April-23 October: Shujiro Nagata
 starting 23 October: Miki Nagano
Miyagi Prefecture: Tsunenosuke Hamada
Miyazaki Prefecture: Shutaro Horiuchi
Nagano Prefecture: Tenta Akaboshi
Niigata Prefecture: Keisuke Sakanaka (until 2 June); Tsuizui Katagawa (starting 2 June)
Okinawa Prefecture: 
 until 28 April: Kyūgorō Ōmi
 28 April-4 May: Iwatarō Otagiri
 starting 4 May: Kuniyoshi Suzuki
Osaka Prefecture: Marques Okubo Toshi Takeshi 
Saga Prefecture: Ishibashi Kazu
Saitama Prefecture: Akiratani Akira (until 13 October); Tadahiko Okada (starting 13 October)
Shiname Prefecture: Ichiro Oriharami 
Tochigi Prefecture: Shin Kitagawa (until 2 June); Hiroyoshi Hiratsuka (starting 2 June)
Tokyo: Yuichi Ionue
Toyama Prefecture: Ki Masesaku 
Yamagata Prefecture: Iwataro Odakiri (until 28 April); Soeda Keiichiro (starting 28 April)

Events
Japan during World War I
January 22 – Japan launches its first domestically manufactured blimp. The blimp left Tokorozawa at 1:30 p.m. and, after landing and refueling at Toyohashi, landed in Osaka at 5:10 p.m. the next day.
November 2 – Prince Hirohito is formally proclaimed Crown Prince and heir apparent.
October 9 – Tokyo Confectionery, as predecessor of Meiji Holdings was founded.
Unknown date
 A truck brand, Isuzu founded, as predecessor name of Ishikawajima Automobile Manufacturing.
 Seinan Gakuin University was founded, as predecessor name was Seinan Gakuin in Fukuoka.

Births
January 9 – Masaharu Taguchi, freestyle swimmer (d. 1982)
January 12 – Haruo Oka, ryūkōka singer (d. 1970)
February 14 – Masaki Kobayashi, film director (d. 1996)
July 1 – Olivia de Havilland, British-American film actress (d. 2020 in France)
August 8 – Shigeo Arai, freestyle swimmer (d. 1944)
August 25 – Saburō Sakai, naval aviator and flying ace (d. 2000)
September 17 – Kuniko Miyake, film actress (d. 1992)
October 10 – Sumiko Mizukubo, film actress
October 15 – Yasuji Miyazaki, Olympic swimmer (d. 1989)

Deaths
January 11 – Takashima Tomonosuke, general (b. 1844)
February 9 – Katō Hiroyuki, academic and politician (b. 1836)
August 8 – Kamimura Hikonojō, admiral (b. 1849)
December 9 – Natsume Sōseki, novelist and poet (b. 1867)
December 10 – Ōyama Iwao, field marshal (b. 1842)

See also
List of Japanese films of the 1910s
Asian and Pacific theater of World War I

References

 
1910s in Japan
Japan
Years of the 20th century in Japan